"Dex, Lies, and Videotape" is the sixth episode of the second season and eighteenth overall episode of the American television drama series Dexter, which first aired on 4 November 2007 on Showtime in the United States. The episode was written by Lauren Gussis and was directed by Nick Gomez.

Title
The episode's title is a pun on the 1989 film Sex, Lies, and Videotape.

Plot

After learning that he was filmed while cleaning his boat at the marina, Dexter becomes desperate and tries to delete the videofile, which he eventually manages to do before computer upgrades enable its viewing by his colleagues. A mock killer mimics, and claims to be inspired by, the Bay Harbor Butcher, and unless the police find him, the FBI may take over the case completely. Dexter finds and kills him before this is possible. After learning about his mother's secret relationship with his foster father, Dexter questions Harry's motives about his own adoption. At Rita's mother suggestion, Dexter brings Lila to dinner, and when Rita finds out that Lila accompanied Dexter on his road trip, Rita breaks up with him. Dexter and Lila leave together and have sex later, which Dexter confesses to Rita later on. Rita wants Dexter to "leave", which he does, and goes back to Lila's place.

Production
Filming locations for the episode included San Pedro, Los Angeles, as well as Long Beach, California.

Reception

The episode was positively received. IGN's Eric Goldman gave the episode a rating of 8.9 out of 10, and commented that "[t]he strong second season of Dexter is gaining a nice amount of momentum and is proving to be one of the best serialized dramas on the air right now. [...]Dexter continues to be on quite a roll." The A.V. Club critic Scott Tobias gave the episode a B grade and stated that "I really love what Keith Carradine is bringing to the show, and this episode provided him with his strongest showcase yet. [...] The show has been guilty in the past of turning everyday Miami Metro operations into sub-standard cop show fodder, and Carradine’s character has turned that around. With him in the picture, even place-holder episodes like this one are highly watchable."

References

External links

 
 "Dex, Lies, and Videotape" at Showtime's website

2007 American television episodes
Dexter (TV series) episodes